Principessa (English title: Princess) is a Mexican telenovela produced by Valentín Pimstein for Televisa in 1984. The telenovela about the adventures and misadventures of a group of friends Paola, Fernanda, Marisela and Adriana working as stylists in the salon "Princess".

It starred Irán Eory, Angélica Aragón, Alma Muriel, Hilda Aguirre, Cecilia Camacho and Anabel Ferreira.

Cast
 
 Irán Eory as Paola Santander
 Angélica Aragón as Fernanda Montenegro (#1)
 Alma Muriel as Fernanda Montenegro (#2)
 Hilda Aguirre as Fernanda Montenegro (#3)
 Cecilia Camacho as Marisela Monteagudo
 Anabel Ferreira as Adriana Elgeta
 Rogelio Guerra as Santiago Pérez
 Gregorio Casal as Leonardo Guerra
 Saby Kamalich as Paulina Ballmer del Prado Sán Millán
 Carlos Cámara as Máximo Torres
 Javier Ruan as Eduardo López
 Germán Robles as Ramiro Huelga
 Manuel Saval as Reynaldo Cevallos (#1)
 Gerardo Paz as Reynaldo Cevallos (#2)
 Álvaro Cerviño as Daniel Martínez
 María Martín as Rocio Montesinos del Valle
 David Ostrosky as Juan Carlos Villanueva
 Surya MacGregor as Franchesca Olazábal
 Mónica Sánchez Navarro as Erika
 Gerardo Murguía as Rodrigo Fujimori
 Leticia Calderón as Vicky
 Arturo Peniche
 Luis Bayardo
 Christopher Lago 
 Elsa Cárdenas as Felisa
 Dina de Marco as Virginia
 Virginia Gutiérrez
 José Elías Moreno as Julio César
 Janet Ruiz as Anita
 Jose Roberto Hill as Danilo
 Leonardo Daniel as Federico
 Stella Inda as Chole
 Rebeca Rambal as Marina
 July Furlong as Elina
 Alfonso Iturralde as Aníbal
 Arturo Guizar as Enrique
 Constantino Costas as Dr. Vargas
 Erika Magnus
 Otto Sirgo as Rodolfo
 Andrés Buenfil as Lisandro
 Luis Uribe as Gerardo
 Josefina Escobedo as Alcira
 Odiseo Bichir as Ismael
 Arlette Pacheco as Maripaz
 Juan Carlos Serrán as Emilio
 Roxana Saucedo as Cristina (#1)
 Cristina Rubiales as Cristina (#2)
 Lorena Rivero as Aurora
  as Martín
 Servando Manzetti as Rubén
 Armando Calvo as Ramón
 Maripaz Banquells as Brenda
 Arturo Lorca as Otto
 Alejandro Tommasi as César
 Alejandro Landero as Casimiro
 Héctor Suárez Gomiz
 Adela Noriega as Alina

Awards

References

External links

1984 telenovelas
Mexican telenovelas
Televisa telenovelas
1984 Mexican television series debuts
1986 Mexican television series endings
Television shows set in Mexico
Mexican television series based on Argentine television series
Spanish-language telenovelas